Star Africa Commodities & Minerals Limited also just known as Star Africa, is an indigenous Ghanaian company involved primarily in Oil and Gas.

History
Star Africa Commodities & Minerals Limited is a fully integrated company founded in 2009 in the Republic of Ghana, initially formed for the purpose of acquiring interests in mineral and hydrocarbon deposits throughout Africa. Based on a carefully executed strategy, Star Africa is leveraging regional assets and contacts to secure viable agricultural, Industrial minerals Mining and Oil and Gas revenue producing assets, along with providing associated products and services.
Star Africa's activities cover three main sectors: Gold mining, Industrial minerals Mining, Agriculture and Oil and Gas.

References

External links
 

Mining companies of Ghana
Agriculture companies of Ghana
Ghanaian companies established in 2009
Agriculture companies established in 2009